Michael Cowley FTSE is an Australian physiologist. He is best known for his mapping of the neural circuits involved in metabolism and obesity and diabetes treatment. He is a professor in the Department of Physiology at Monash University in the Faculty of Biomedical and Psychological Sciences. He is also a director of the Australian diabetes drug development company, Verva Inc, and director of the Monash Obesity & Diabetes Institute] (modi).

Cowley is a Fellow of the Australian Academy of Technological Sciences and Engineering, a Veski Innovation Fellow and, in 2009, was awarded The Australian Science Minister's Prize for Australian Life Scientist of the Year. In 2014 Cowley was the recipient of the inaugural Jacques Miller Medal for Experimental BioMedicine from the Australian Academy of Science.
 
Cowley's work has mapped the neural circuits in the brain that sense nutrients and fat to control appetite and body weight. He has published more than 75 papers and chapters, is the inventor of 85 patents, and the co-founder of Orexigen Therapeutics, a publicly listed (NASDAQ: OREX) San Diego biotech company, where he served as the chief scientific officer until December 2008, when he returned to Monash University.

Cowley has a significant focus on public outreach, the promotion of science in schools, and better metabolic health.

Education
Cowley has a Bachelor of Science from both the University of Melbourne and Monash University. He obtained his PhD at Prince Henry's Institute of Medical Research at Monash Medical Centre, before obtaining a post-doctoral fellowship at The Vollum Institute in Oregon.

Career
Cowley began his research career at Monash University and at the Prince Henry Institute of Medical Research. He then went to the US, where he was assistant professor at Oregon Health and Science University. He also worked at the biopharmaceutical company Neurocrine Biosciences in California. He later founded his own company, Orexigen Therapeutics Inc (NASDAQ: OREX), which he took public in April 2007, raising US$255M to fund the drug development program. He is the inventor of 10 families of patent applications, has published more than 75 papers, with 85 patents relating to obesity.

In 2014 Cowley was the recipient of the inaugural Jacques Miller Medal for Experimental BioMedicine from the Australian Academy of Science.

In 2009 he was awarded the (Australian) Science Minister's Prize for Life Scientist of the Year and a Pfizer Australia Senior Research Fellowship.

Cowley was the inventor of several drugs, including Contrave®, which the FDA approved in 2014. Previous positions held by Cowley include core director, and associate scientist at Oregon Health & Sciences University.

Memberships and affiliations

Cowley is a member of the scientific advisory board of The Centre for Obesity Research and Education (CORE), The Alfred Hospital, Melbourne, Australia, and Gubra ApS, Denmark.  He is also a non-executive director of Verva Pharmaceuticals, Ltd., a Victorian-based clinical-stage pharmaceutical company developing innovative therapies to treat metabolic diseases.

Professor Cowley is member of the Society for Neuroscience and The Endocrine Society. He is a senior editor for Neuroendocrinology, and was a member of the editorial board of Endocrinology and The American Journal of Physiology.

Qualifications
1999 Doctor of Philosophy (Medicine), Monash University 
1993 Bachelor of Science, Honours (Physiology), Monash University
1989 Bachelor of Science, The University of Melbourne

Career highlights, awards, fellowships and grants
Cowley has secured funding support in excess of $18m.
2008–present Research professor, Department of Physiology, Faculty of Biomedical and Psychological Sciences, Faculty of Medicine, Nursing and Health Sciences, Monash University
2015-2019 NHMRC Fellowship: Breaking the link between obesity and metabolic disease
2014-2018 NHMRC Project Grant: Effects of melanocortin neurons on systemic glucose homeostasis
2014-2019 NovoNordisk Diabetes target Discovery Research Collaboration
2014 Inaugural Jacques Miller Medal for Experimental Biomedicine, Australian Academy of Science
2013-2014 Australia Academy of Science German-Australian Mobility Call
2013 NHMRC Equipment grant 
2013 NovoNordisk Peptide YY Regulation of Blood Glucose 
2012 NHMRC Equipment grant 
2012-2014 NHMRC Project Grant: Can Blockade of Leptin Action in the Brain Reduce Blood Pressure in Obese Mice?” 
2012-2013 NHMRC Development Grant : Development of a modified gp130 ligand to treat obesity-induced insulin resistance
2012 NHMRC Equipment Grant 
2011-2014 NHMRC Project Grant: The Role of Brain Inflammation in Leptin Resistance 
2010 NHMRC Equipment grant 
2010-2012 aHeart Research Foundation Project Grant: Does Leptin Cause Hypertension?
2010-2013 NHMRC Project Grant: Does Loss of Melanocortin Glucose Sensing Contribute to Diet Induced Diabetes? 
2011 Fellow of the Australian Academy of Technological Sciences and Engineering (FTSE)
2009–2014 Pfizer Australia Senior Research Fellowship
2009 Science Minister's Prize for Life Scientist of the Year
2008–present Research professor, Department of Physiology, Monash University
2009 High Blood Pressure Research Council of Australia Austin Doyle Lectureship
2008 Victorian Endowment for Science, Knowledge, and Innovation Fellowship
2008 Monash University STAR recruit
2007–2008 Associate scientist, Oregon Health and Science University, US
2006–2008 Member, Heart Research and Diabetes Center, Oregon Health and Science University, US
2002–2009 Founder, chief scientific officer and consultant, Orexigen Therapeutics, US
2002–2007 Director, Electrophysiology Core, Oregon Health and Science University, US
2001–2007 Assistant scientist, Oregon Health and Science University, US
2001–2007 Assistant professor, physiology and pharmacology, Oregon Health and Science University, US
2000–2002 Consultant, Neurocrine Biosciences, San Diego, US
2000–2001 Research assistant professor, The Vollum Institute, Oregon Health and Science University, US
1998–2000 Postdoctoral fellow, The Vollum Institute, Oregon Health and Science University, US
1996 Queen Elizabeth II Silver Jubilee Trust for Young Australians, Queen's Trust Achiever Award
1996 Queen Elizabeth II Silver Jubilee Trust for Young Australians, Future Perspectives Forum: Personal Responsibility for Australia's Future
1996 Endocrine Society of Australia Travel Award
1994–1998 Graduate student, reproductive neuroendocrinology, Monash University and Prince Henry's Institute for Medical Research

Research highlights
Cowley's greatest research achievements have been to describe the fundamental physiological mechanisms of homeostasis of weight, temperature, blood pressure and heart rate. His work has shown new light on how these basic processes are physiologically regulated, and some of the causes of diseases and disorders of these processes. He has described the neural mechanisms and circuits that decode the body signals of weight (fat) and glucose stores, which has led to new treatments for both obesity and diabetes.

Cowley has invented and developed novel drugs to redress aberrant weight control and food cravings, and one of these drugs, Contrave, was approved by the FDA in 2014. Cowley established and led a multinational drug target discovery program with a US University and with a global pharmaceutical company, spanning five years.

Other achievements include:
Pioneered the use of patch clamp electrophysiology of genetically labelled neurons to analyse the actions of hormones on the brain
Created a circuit diagram of the metabolic control centres of the brain
Predicted that the gut peptide PYY3–36 would have anorexic and weight loss effects
Invented 10 families of patent applications (85 patents in total with 28 issued, the rest pending) around obesity drug screens and drug targets
Developed several drug targets including peptide YY, and several novel drug combinations including Naltrexone + Buproopion; both are now in phase 2/3 development
Founding intellectual property behind Thiakis Inc, recently acquired by Wyeth, and founder and chief scientific officer of Orexigen Therapeutics
Received 37 sponsored research awards with value in excess of $18 million
Has given 120 invited national and international lectures, published 61 original manuscripts and written 24 reviews

References

External links
 Monash University Faculty of Biomedical and Psychological Sciences
 Monash University Staff profile
 VESKI Innovation Fellowship
 modi
 modi press room

Australian physiologists
Living people
Fellows of the Australian Academy of Technological Sciences and Engineering
Year of birth missing (living people)